A Boy Called Christmas is a 2021 British Christmas fantasy film directed by Gil Kenan from a screenplay by Ol Parker and Kenan, based on the 2015 book of the same name by Matt Haig.

The film was released on 26 November 2021 in the United Kingdom, Australia, New Zealand, France, Germany and China, by StudioCanal, while Netflix released the film internationally, on 24 November 2021. The film received positive reviews from critics.

In the United Kingdom, the film was classed as a 'Sky Original' and became available to watch on Sky Cinema and streaming on Sky's streaming service NOW.

Plot
On Christmas Eve, Andrea, Moppet, and Patrick, whose mother has died recently and whose father is leaving for an urgent task for work, are put in the care of Aunt Ruth, an old woman who tries to entertain the children by telling a Christmas tale.

13-year-old Nikolas and his father Joel, a woodcutter, live in the forest. Nikolas' mother had died two years before, eaten by a bear, and Nikolas tries to take comfort every night remembering the legend of a place called Elfhelm, where a girl found a magical place inhabited by elves that helped her to survive the winter. One night a mouse tries to steal some food but his life is spared by Nikolas who calls the mouse Miika and tries to teach him to speak.

One day, the King calls his subjects and promises a big reward if someone is able to find an object that would bring hope to the kingdom. Joel joins a group of hunters to try to find Elfhelm. Joel leaves Nikolas under the care of Aunt Carlotta, a selfish woman who makes Nikolas' life miserable.

Nikolas finds a map that confirms the existence of Elfhelm so he decides to go to the Extreme North to find his father and give him the map. During the journey, Nikolas learns that Miika has learned to speak and this provides hope in continuing his quest. When they reach the Half Moon Forest, a reindeer who Nikolas names Blitzen allows Nikolas to mount him.

The trio reaches Elfhelm but finds nothing there except for Joel's knife. Nikolas loses hope and collapses. He is found by Little Noosh and Father Topo. Father Topo gives Nikolas a "hope spell" that allows him to recover. Father Topo informs him that he is in Elfhelm, but it is only visible to the people who believe in the place.

Nikolas is able to see the place after believing in the elves and tries to stay in the town. He learns that a group of humans, including Joel, has kidnapped a small elf called Little Kip. Nikolas is sentenced to be eaten by a troll in the Dark Tower. Nikolas manages to escape with the help of a young fairy called the Truth Pixie. He then decides to try to find Joel's party and clarify the misunderstanding.

In the forest, Nikolas finds a group of hunters and Little Kip, but he is trapped by the hunters and discovers his father is along with them. Joel has a change of heart and comes up with a plan. He frees Nikolas, Little Kip, and Blitzen and they run away from the hunters. Blitzen is unable to lift the sled with Joel sitting in it, so he decides to sacrifice himself to allow the trio to fly away.

Nikolas comes back to Elfhelm with Little Kip and he is able to bring the little elf on time to prevent Father Topo from being punished. Little Kip's parents reward Nikolas with the elves' traditional making of toys. Nikolas then has an idea and has all the elves create bountiful gifts of toys and candies. Nikolas is about to ride Blitzen with the gifts when he is confronted by Mother Vodol. She sees the locket he carries with him showing the portrait of her mother, revealing that the girl who reached Elfhelm in the legend is none other than Nikolas's mother.

Mother Vodol then tells him about how she lost faith in the humans when news spread in the place that the men (including Joel) took Little Kip. Nikolas tells her that his mother always remembered how joyful it was in Elfhelm.

Nikolas goes back to the kingdom one night and he shows himself to the King, offering one of the toys. Confused, the King asks him about the meaning of the gift, leading Nikolas to take him to all the houses in the kingdom to leave toys for the children while trying to not disturb them. The King is moved and decides to help him.

Finishing the story, Aunt Ruth explains to the children the meaning of Nikolas's actions and she felt that one of them has already accepted the fate of their mother and is learning to live with that. The children already figure the boy is Santa Claus. The children's father comes back, to find to their surprise that the living room is filled with Christmas ornaments and presents. Aunt Ruth then leaves the place and throws a firecracker in the ending scene, revealing herself to be the Truth Pixie.

Cast

Production
A deal was completed in May 2016 for the book to be adapted into film by Blueprint Pictures and StudioCanal. Ol Parker was set to write the screenplay.

In April 2019, Gil Kenan was revealed to be directing the film, with Jim Broadbent, Sally Hawkins, Maggie Smith and Kristen Wiig amongst the cast. Filming began that same month, with production occurring in Lapland, Finland, Czech Republic, Slovakia and London.

Release
The film was released on 26 November 2021 in the United Kingdom, Australia, New Zealand, France, Germany and China, by StudioCanal, while Netflix released the film elsewhere, on 24 November 2021.

Reception
On Rotten Tomatoes, the film has an approval rating of 83% based on 30 reviews, with an average rating of 6.70/10. The site's critical consensus reads, "A Boy Called Christmas offers few surprises, but makes up for its lack of originality with a heaping helping of winsome holiday spirit." On Metacritic, the film has a weighted average score of 66 out of 100 based on 5 critics, indicating "generally favorable reviews".

See also
 List of Christmas films

References

External links

2020s Christmas films
2021 fantasy films
British Christmas films
British fantasy films
Christmas adventure films
Films directed by Gil Kenan
Films scored by Dario Marianelli
Films shot in the Czech Republic
Films shot in Finland
Films shot in London
Films shot in Slovakia
2020s English-language films
2020s British films
StudioCanal films